Stockholm Municipality is one of the 29 multi-member constituencies of the Riksdag, the national legislature of Sweden. The constituency was established in 1970 when the Riksdag changed from a bicameral legislature to a unicameral legislature. It is conterminous with the municipality of Stockholm. The constituency currently elects 29 of the 349 members of the Riksdag using the open party-list proportional representation electoral system. At the 2022 general election it had 728,089 registered electors.

Electoral system
Stockholm Municipality currently elects 29 of the 349 members of the Riksdag using the open party-list proportional representation electoral system. Constituency seats are allocated using the modified Sainte-Laguë method. Only parties that that reach the 4% national threshold and parties that receive at least 12% of the vote in the constituency compete for constituency seats. Supplementary leveling seats may also be allocated at the constituency level to parties that reach the 4% national threshold.

Election results

Summary 

(Excludes leveling seats)

Detailed

2020s

2022
Results of the 2022 general election held on 11 September 2022:

The following candidates were elected:
 Constituency seats - Martin Ådahl (C), 282 votes; Kristina Axén Olin (M), 542 votes; Malin Björk (C), 179 votes; Per Bolund (MP), 4,291 votes; Camilla Brodin (KD), 28 votes; Margareta Cederfelt (M), 138 votes; Lorena Delgado Varas (V), 350 votes; Ali Esbati (V), 1,326 votes; Joar Forssell (L), 128 votes; Johan Forssell (M), 1,690 votes; Jytte Guteland (S), 1,566 votes; Markus Kallifatides (S), 1,381 votes; Arin Karapet (M), 181 votes; Fredrik Kärrholm (M), 2,576 votes; Kadir Kasirga (S), 1,014 votes; Gabriel Kroon (SD), 9 votes; Åsa Lindhagen (MP), 1,115 votes; Romina Pourmokhtari (L), 1,019 votes; Karin Rågsjö (V), 345 votes; Mirja Räihä (S), 1,106 votes; Lawen Redar (S), 1,201 votes; Jessica Rosencrantz (M), 526 votes; Annika Strandhäll (S), 2,923 votes; Elisabeth Thand Ringqvist (C), 270 votes; Mattias Vepsä (S), 439 votes; Henrik Vinge (SD), 149 votes; Ulrika Westerlund (MP), 823 votes; Elsa Widding (SD), 944 votes; and Anders Ygeman (S), 6,979 votes.
 Leveling seats - Angelika Bengtsson (SD), 64 votes; Malin Danielsson (L), 37 votes; Ida Gabrielsson (V), 142 votes; Daniel Helldén (MP), 812 votes; and Daniel Vencu Velasquez Castro (S), 341 votes.

2010s

2018
Results of the 2018 general election held on 9 September 2018:

The following candidates were elected:
 Constituency seats - Martin Ådahl (C), 293 votes; Beatrice Ask (M), 733 votes; Gulan Avci (L), 630 votes; Kristina Axén Olin (M), 1,065 votes; Per Bolund (MP), 803 votes; Margareta Cederfelt (M), 176 votes; Nooshi Dadgostar (V), 1,127 votes; Yasmine Eriksson (SD), 67 votes; Ali Esbati (V), 1,299 votes; Johan Forssell (M), 636 votes; Johan Hedin (C), 102 votes; Jens Holm (V), 674 votes; Ylva Johansson (S), 2,562 votes; Johanna Jönsson (C), 522 votes; Arin Karapet (M), 312 votes; Kadir Kasirga (S), 784 votes; Ulf Kristersson (M), 29,007 votes; Dag Larsson (S), 423 votes; Isabella Lövin (MP), 4,933 votes; Fredrik Malm (L), 458 votes; Katja Nyberg (SD), 102 votes; Anders Österberg (S), 826 votes; Karin Rågsjö (V), 517 votes; Lawen Redar (S), 1,213 votes; Jessica Rosencrantz (M), 432 votes; Annika Strandhäll (S), 2,027 votes; Caroline Szyber (KD), 230 votes; Henrik Vinge (SD), 134 votes; and Anders Ygeman (S), 10,254 votes.
 Leveling seats - Maria Ferm (MP), 926 votes; Joar Forssell (L), 443 votes; and Teres Lindberg (S), 445 votes.

2014
Results of the 2014 general election held on 14 September 2014:

The following candidates were elected:
 Constituency seats - Maria Abrahamsson (M), 957 votes; Amir Adan (M), 422 votes; Sofia Arkelsten (M), 416 votes; Beatrice Ask (M), 405 votes; Angelika Bengtsson (SD), 22 votes; Per Bolund (MP), 920 votes; Margareta Cederfelt (M), 227 votes; Maria Ferm (MP), 1,174 votes; Johan Forssell (M), 235 votes; Tina Ghasemi (M), 710 votes; Arhe Hamednaca (S), 520 votes; Johan Hedin (C), 318 votes; Jens Holm (V), 506 votes; Carin Jämtin (S), 1,907 votes; Ylva Johansson (S), 595 votes; Johanna Jönsson (C), 281 votes; Stefan Löfven (S), 21,378 votes; Adam Marttinen (SD), 3 votes; Birgitta Ohlsson (FP), 6,646 votes; Per Olsson (MP), 353 votes; Emanuel Öz (S), 776 votes; Veronica Palm (S), 1,111 votes; Karin Rågsjö (V), 336 votes; Fredrik Reinfeldt (M), 42,873 votes; Åsa Romson (MP), 6,320 votes; Jessica Rosencrantz (M), 552 votes; Caroline Szyber (KD), 907 votes; Erik Ullenhag (FP), 679 votes; and Anders Ygeman (S), 266 votes.
 Leveling seats - Amineh Kakabaveh (V), 571 votes; Fredrik Malm (FP), 536 votes; and Désirée Pethrus (KD), 150 votes.

2010
Results of the 2010 general election held on 19 September 2010:

The following candidates were elected:
 Constituency seats - Maria Abrahamsson (M), 2,042 votes; Lena Adelsohn Liljeroth (M), 321 votes; Sofia Arkelsten (M), 551 votes; Beatrice Ask (M), 432 votes; Gustav Blix (M), 330 votes; Josefin Brink (V), 1,727 votes; Andreas Carlgren (C), 521 votes; Fredrick Federley (C), 1,456 votes; Johan Forssell (M), 322 votes; Göran Hägglund (KD), 3,873 votes; Robert Halef (KD), 128 votes; Arhe Hamednaca (S), 505 votes; Jens Holm (V), 504 votes; Mats Johansson (M), 52 votes; Ylva Johansson (S), 661 votes; Mehmet Kaplan (MP), 1,050 votes; Anna König Jerlmyr (M), 443 votes; David Lång (SD), 48 votes; Birgitta Ohlsson (FP), 3,571 votes; Veronica Palm (S), 851 votes; Fredrik Reinfeldt (M), 45,105 votes; Åsa Romson (MP), 396 votes; Mona Sahlin (S), 26,410 votes; Börje Vestlund (S), 185 votes; H. G. Wessberg (M), 79 votes; Barbro Westerholm (FP), 785 votes; Maria Wetterstrand (MP), 16,799 votes; and Anders Ygeman (S), 487 votes.
 Leveling seats - Carl B. Hamilton (FP), 567 votes.

2000s

2006
Results of the 2006 general election held on 17 September 2006:

The following candidates were elected:
 Constituency seats - Lena Adelsohn Liljeroth (M), 526 votes; Beatrice Ask (M), 502 votes; Jan Björklund (FP), 2,213 votes; Fredrick Federley (C), 1,391 votes; Johan Forssell (M), 598 votes; Göran Hägglund (KD), 3,289 votes; Carl B. Hamilton (FP), 1,013 votes; Carin Jämtin (S), 4,999 votes; Mats Johansson (M), 92 votes; Mehmet Kaplan (MP), 1,171 votes; Anna König (M), 757 votes; Kalle Larsson (V), 354 votes; Anna Lilliehöök (M), 103 votes; Sylvia Lindgren (S), 571 votes; Mats G. Nilsson (M), 182 votes; Sten Nordin (M), 273 votes; Mikael Odenberg (M), 138 votes; Birgitta Ohlsson (FP), 2,582 votes; Veronica Palm (S), 1,159 votes; Nikos Papadopoulos (S), 601 votes; Fredrik Reinfeldt (M), 37,971 votes; Bosse Ringholm (S), 3,818 votes; Åsa Romson (MP), 368 votes; Solveig Ternström (C), 1,177 votes; Maria Wetterstrand (MP), 8,202 votes; Anders Ygeman (S), 547 votes; and Pernilla Zethraeus (V), 447 votes.
 Leveling seats - Sebastian Cederschiöld (M), 134 votes.

2002
Results of the 2002 general election held on 15 September 2002:

The following candidates were elected:
 Constituency seats - Lena Adelsohn Liljeroth (M), 2,990 votes; Beatrice Ask (M), 2,251 votes; Stefan Attefall (KD), 87 votes; Gunilla Carlsson (M), 4,271 votes; Joe Frans (S), 341 votes; Gustav Fridolin (MP), 1,414 votes; Maria Hassan (S), 848 votes; Ulla Hoffmann (V), 109 votes; Helena Höij (KD), 69 votes; Gunnar Hökmark (M), 1,736 votes; Henrik S. Järrel (M), 438 votes; Bo Könberg (FP), 2,524 votes; Kalle Larsson (V), 281 votes; Sylvia Lindgren (S), 1,043 votes; Ana Maria Narti (FP), 922 votes; Mikael Odenberg (M), 293 votes; Birgitta Ohlsson (FP), 3,109 votes; Lars Ohly (V), 761 votes; Veronica Palm (S), 1,390 votes; Nikos Papadopoulos (S), 1,451 votes; Bosse Ringholm (S), 8,088 votes; Gabriel Romanus (FP), 449 votes; Yvonne Ruwaida (MP), 580 votes; Nyamko Sabuni (FP), 2,143 votes; Inger Segelström (S), 1,500 votes; Börje Vestlund (S), 306 votes; and Anders Ygeman (S), 427 votes.
 Leveling seats - Anna Lilliehöök (M), 213 votes; and Mauricio Rojas (FP), 3,225 votes.

1990s

1998
Results of the 1998 general election held on 20 September 1998:

The following candidates were elected:
 Constituency seats - Rolf Åbjörnsson (KD), 534 votes; Beatrice Ask (M), 577 votes; Stefan Attefall (KD), 59 votes; Nalin Baksi (S), 4,896 votes; Carl Bildt (M), 42,303 votes; Mats Einarsson (V), 102 votes; Elisabeth Fleetwood (M), 189 votes; Carl Erik Hedlund (M), 101 votes; Henrik S. Järrel (M), 260 votes; Ingemar Josefsson (S), 684 votes; Ulf Kristersson (M), 512 votes; Bo Könberg (FP), 2,524 votes; Ewa Larsson (MP), 277 votes; Roland Larsson (S), 261 votes; Sylvia Lindgren (S), 723 votes; Mikael Odenberg (M), 150 votes; Lars Ohly (V), 1,145 votes; Yvonne Ruwaida (MP), 783 votes; Pierre Schori (S), 5,479 votes; Gudrun Schyman (V), 15,065 votes; Inger Segelström (S), 1,181 votes; Carl-Erik Skårman (M), 210 votes; Barbro Westerholm (FP), 2,664 votes; Birgitta Wistrand (M), 155 votes; Anders Ygeman (S), 292 votes; and Eva Zetterberg (V), 673 votes.
 Leveling seats - Helena Höij (KD), 181 votes; and Anna Lilliehöök (M), 278 votes.

1994
Results of the 1994 general election held on 18 September 1994:

1991
Results of the 1991 general election held on 15 September 1991:

1980s

1988
Results of the 1988 general election held on 18 September 1988:

1985
Results of the 1985 general election held on 15 September 1985:

1982
Results of the 1982 general election held on 19 September 1982:

1970s

1979
Results of the 1979 general election held on 16 September 1979:

1976
Results of the 1976 general election held on 19 September 1976:

1973
Results of the 1973 general election held on 16 September 1973:

1970
Results of the 1970 general election held on 20 September 1970:

References

Riksdag constituencies
Riksdag constituencies established in 1970
Riksdag constituency